Sandeep Jakhar is an Indian politician and member of Indian National Congress. He is currently serving as a member of the Punjab Legislative Assembly from Abohar. He defeated BJP Leader Arun Narang from Abohar in 2022 Punjab Assembly Elections. He is the nephew of former Punjab Congress President Sunil Jakhar.

Personal life 

Sandeep belongs to a prominent Hindu Jat family from Abohar. His family has been associated with the Congress Party from three generations.. Sandeep is an alumnus of Mayo College, Ajmer. Sandeep studied for two years in Switzerland before graduating from Miami. He worked as head of Country Club in Florida. He is married to Atsuko Jakhar.

Sandeep's father, Surinder Jakhar has served as chairman of Asia’s cooperative fertiliser giant IFFCO for four terms and chief of Asian Cooperative Alliance for two terms.

Political career 
His grandfather Balram Jakhar has served as the Speaker of the Lok Sabha, Governor of Madhya Pradesh and Union agriculture minister during the Narasimha Rao government. Balram Jakhar was also the longest serving Speaker of the Lok Sabha.

His uncle Sunil Jakhar is a 3-time MLA,1- time MP and former President of Punjab Pradesh Congress Committee.

Sandeep has served as district President of Youth Congress Unit in Punjab.

MLA
Sandeep contested his first Punjab Legislative Assembly elections in 2022 from his family's traditional seat Abohar and won by a margin of 5,471 votes.  The Aam Aadmi Party gained a strong 79% majority in the sixteenth Punjab Legislative Assembly by winning 92 out of 117 seats in the 2022 Punjab Legislative Assembly election. MP Bhagwant Mann was sworn in as Chief Minister on 16 March 2022.

References

External links 

 

Indian National Congress politicians from Punjab, India
Living people
Punjab, India MLAs 2022–2027
People from Fazilka district
Indian National Congress politicians
Indian National Congress (Organisation) politicians
21st-century Indian politicians
1976 births